Goplala Achutha "G. A" Menon (1931–2003) was a US-based entrepreneur of Kerala origin.  Born in North Paravur in Kerala Studied at Government Higher Secondary School (North Paravur), he majored in mathematics at Madras University and went to Harvard Business School. He began his career as a Systems Manager with IBM in India. When IBM closed down in India in 1978, he moved to Singapore where he joined the Chandaria Group. As an employee of Chandaria Group, he set up Multi Tech Systems, which merged with Venture Manufacturing Singapore Ltd in 1989. Menon continued to be the Chairman of Venture Corporation until his death.

After becoming a successful entrepreneur, he first came to Kerala with a proposal to set up a Rs 6,000-crore petrochemical complex at Kasaragod, which did not take off. Subsequently, he set up the two Technopark companies namely UST Global and Toonz Animation. Other companies, he was involved in India, were Dexcel Electronic Designs, Bangalore and Customer Line, Kochi.

He was also the founder and chairman of US-based Magnecomp International. The company was a manufacturer of the suspension assembly, an extremely high-precision component used in the read/write heads of computer hard disk drives.

References

1931 births
2003 deaths
Businesspeople from Kerala
Harvard Business School alumni
University of Madras alumni